The 2016 Red Bull Ring GP2 Series round was a GP2 Series motor race held on 2 and 3 July 2016 at the Red Bull Ring in Austria. It was the fourth round of the 2016 GP2 Series. The race weekend supported the 2016 Austrian Grand Prix.

Background
Following the Baku round, Nobuharu Matsushita was suspended from competing in the Austrian GP2 round due to erratic driving that caused several collisions during the restarts. On 28 June, ART Grand Prix announced René Binder as Matsushita's replacement.

Report

Qualifying
Arden International GP2 driver, Jimmy Eriksson will carry through a three-place grid penalty from the previous round after GP2 stewards deemed him to be at fault in the collision between himself and Jordan King.

Sergey Sirotkin achieved the fastest time of 1:13.663, thereby achieving his second pole position of the year. Antonio Giovinazzi narrowly missed out by six-thousandths of a second and Pierre Gasly occupied third. The session however, ended under yellow flags after Jimmy Eriksson's car stopped at turn seven.

Notes
1. – Jeffri received a three-place grid penalty after having failed to slow down under yellow flag conditions.
2. – Canamasas received a three-place grid penalty after having been deemed to impede a fellow driver.
3. – Latifi received a three-place grid penalty after having been deemed to impede a fellow driver.
4. – Eriksson received a three-place grid penalty adhered from the previous round in Baku. Arden subsequently elected to start him from the pitlane.

Feature Race
The Feature Race for GP2 was delayed by 15 minutes due to incidents that occurred in the preceding Formula One qualifying session. The race saw changing conditions that effected the outcome of the race. While the bottom of the circuit would be dry, heavy rainfall would be at the top. Gasly spun from the lead which triggered a safety car and a flurry of pitstops. On lap 28, Marvin Kirchhöfer also spun, which triggered another safety car. Upon exiting the pitlane shortly thereafter, Artem Markelov hit the wall on pit exit, prompting a red flag due to damage to the track. After a lengthy delay, the race was restarted behind the safety car with the Campos pair of Mitch Evans and Sean Gelael leading and Philo Paz Armand, who incurred a penalty after overtaking the safety car. Raffaele Marciello began to charge through the field on fresh super soft tyres, but as the pace in the compound started to fade away, Evans took control and won his first race of the season.

Notes
1. – Sirotkin was given a ten-second time penalty for failing to re-establish his original starting position before the safety car line and of failing to re-enter the pitlane.
2. – Malja was given a ten-second time penalty for passing several cars as well as the safety car between turns seven and eight during the safety car period without permission from the Race Director.

Sprint Race
The Sprint Race was held under atrocious conditions, with rain affecting the entire race. This would catch out drivers throughout the race and would lead to two safety cars. The first of which came as a result of Sean Gelael retiring after being hit by Arthur Pic on lap three. The second safety car came after Nicholas Latifi spun on the exit of turn one on lap ten. By this stage, the circuit was beginning to dry and some drivers elected to pit for dry tyres in an attempt to take advantage of the changing conditions. However, the track had not dried out sufficiently by this stage and so saw most of the competitors struggling for grip for the first few laps into the stint. As well as this, the restart was prompt and the group that had pitted for dry tyres were left far behind the leading pack by the time of the restart. In the end, Racing Engineering's Jordan King completed a dominant performance and earned his first GP2 win and Racing Engineering's second of the season.

Standings after the round

Drivers' Championship standings

Teams' Championship standings

 Note: Only the top five positions are included for both sets of standings.

See also 
 2016 Austrian Grand Prix
 2016 Red Bull Ring GP3 Series round

References

External links 
 Official website of GP2 Series

GP2
Red Bull Ring
Red Bull Ring